Amy Holton Lyons (born April 5, 1965) is an American former professional tennis player.

Biography
Holton, one of four children to Richard and Marcy, spent her early years in Dayton, Ohio before moving to Sarasota, Florida in the late 1970s. She attended Riverview High School and won a state title with the team in 1980, as well as national titles in doubles during this time with elder sister Kathy. The pair also played together professionally, including at the French Open and Wimbledon.

As a singles player, Holton was a semi-finalist at the 1983 Pittsburgh Open and twice made the French Open third round, in 1983 and 1984. At the 1984 Wimbledon Championships she played her most high-profile match when she lost in the second round to top seed Martina Navratilova.

In 1986 she was runner-up at two Virginia Slims doubles tournaments, in Perugia and Berkeley.

WTA Tour finals

Doubles (0–2)

References

External links
 
 

1965 births
Living people
American female tennis players
Tennis people from Ohio
Tennis people from Florida
Sportspeople from Sarasota, Florida
Riverview High School (Sarasota, Florida) alumni
21st-century American women